Mudir Al-Radaei (born 1 January 1993) is a Yemeni international footballer who plays as a defender.

International career

International goals
Scores and results list Yemen's goal tally first.

References

External links 
 

1993 births
Living people
Yemeni footballers
Yemeni expatriate footballers
Yemen international footballers
Yemeni expatriate sportspeople in Bahrain
Yemeni expatriate sportspeople in Qatar
Expatriate footballers in Bahrain
Expatriate footballers in Qatar
Al-Ahli Club Sana'a players
East Riffa Club players
Al-Arabi SC (Qatar) players
Al-Wakrah SC players
Yemeni League players
Bahraini Premier League players
Qatar Stars League players
Qatari Second Division players
2019 AFC Asian Cup players
Association football defenders
People from Sanaa